Kunpeng may refer to:
Kun and Peng, two forms of a creature from Chinese mythology
Kunpeng Airlines, former name of Henan Airlines, charter airline based in northern China
Kunpeng 920 (Huawei Kunpeng 920), ARM-based server CPU produced by HiSilicon (7nm process).

See also
Kunpengopterus